Ivan Krstić is a Croatian computer security expert, currently working on core security at Apple Inc. Krstić was previously the director of security architecture at One Laptop per Child. He is a co-author of The Official Ubuntu Book.

Biography
Born in Croatia, Krstić received a scholarship to attend the Cranbrook Kingswood school in Michigan, U.S, when he was 15. In 2004, he enrolled at Harvard College but took a year's leave to work on secure electronic healthcare at Croatia's largest children's hospital. After returning to Harvard in 2005, he took another leave when offered a position with One Laptop per Child. While there, he designed the Bitfrost security architecture and personally oversaw the project's first two in-country deployments, in Uruguay and Peru. He left the project in early 2008 and later joined Apple in May 2009.

Recognition
In 2007, Krstić became a TR35 laureate, selected by the MIT Technology Review as one of the world's top 35 innovators under the age of 35. A year later, eWeek magazine declared him one of the top three most influential people in modern computer security, and one of the top 100 in all of IT.

References

Apple Inc. employees
Cypherpunks
Living people
Computer security specialists
Computer systems engineers
Croatian engineers
Harvard College alumni
Croatian emigrants to the United States
Cranbrook Educational Community alumni
1986 births